Rumat al-Heib is a Bedouin village in northern Israel. Located near Nazareth in the Lower Galilee, it falls under the jurisdiction of the al-Batuf Regional Council.

History

British Mandate era
The village was established at the beginning of the 1920s by members of the Arab al-Heib tribe and was originally named after the family.

In the  1931 census the population was counted with nearby Rumana, and together they had  197 inhabitants;  195 Muslims and 2 Christians, in a total of 36 houses.

1948, Israel
The al-Heib Bedouin tribe was one of the several Bedouin allies of the Jewish military forces during the 1948 Arab–Israeli War, actively participating in securing the lower Galilee and the Beit She'an Valley from Arab paramilitaries and the Arab Liberation Army. The al-Heib fighters later formed the core of the Minorities Unit of the Israel Defense Forces. Up to this day, many of the al-Heib men conscript for a full service in the IDF, and many also volunteer for professional military service. The Bedouin Soldier memorial is located in the vicinity of the village.
In 2007, there were tensions between the village and the nearby moshav of Tzippori, with the Bedouins accused of cattle rustling.

References

Bibliography

External links
Welcome To Rummat Heib

Arab villages in Israel
Al-Batuf Regional Council
Populated places in Northern District (Israel)
1920s establishments in Mandatory Palestine
Populated places established in the 1920s